= OR55B1P =

Protein-coding gene in the species Homo sapiens

Identifiers
- Aliases: OR55B1P, OR55B2P, OR55C1P, olfactory receptor family 55 subfamily B member 1 pseudogene
- External IDs: GeneCards: OR55B1P
Orthologs
Databases	NCBI: entry; OMA: entry
Species	Human	Mouse
Entrez	390030	n/a
Ensembl	ENSG00000231548	n/a
UniProt	n a	n/a
RefSeq (mRNA)	n/a	n/a
RefSeq (protein)	n/a	n/a
Location (UCSC)	n/a	n/a
PubMed search		n/a
- Wikidata
View/Edit Human

Olfactory receptor 55B1 is a pseudogene that in humans is encoded by the OR55B1P gene.

Olfactory receptors interact with odorant molecules in the nose, to initiate a neuronal response that triggers the perception of a smell. The olfactory receptor proteins are members of a large family of G-protein-coupled receptors (GPCR) arising from single coding-exon genes. Olfactory receptors share a 7-transmembrane domain structure with many neurotransmitter and hormone receptors and are responsible for the recognition and G protein-mediated transduction of odorant signals. The olfactory receptor gene family is the largest in the genome. The nomenclature assigned to the olfactory receptor genes and proteins for this organism is independent of other organisms.

== See also ==
- Olfactory receptor
